Koo Ja-cheol (or  ; born 27 February 1989) is a South Korean footballer who plays for Jeju United as a midfielder. Koo is one of the three most successful South Korean players with careers in the German Bundesliga, alongside Cha Bum-kun and Son Heung-min. He played for VfL Wolfsburg, FC Augsburg and Mainz 05 with 211 Bundesliga appearances. He also captained the South Korea national team in the 2012 Summer Olympics and the 2014 FIFA World Cup, and won a bronze medal in the Summer Olympics.

Early life 
Koo started football at age ten when a nearby elementary school opened its football club. During his early youth career, he mostly played as a defender, often taking sweeper role. However, he wasn't particularly outstanding and the fact he suffered from anemia also hindered him from gaining attention. In 2006, as a member of Boin High School, Koo participated in the Baekrok High School Football Competition that is annually held in Jeju Island. Leading Boin High School to a runner-up place with an outstanding performance, he grabbed the attention of Jung Hae-seong, who was then the manager of Jeju United.

Club career

Jeju United
In 2007, Koo was selected by Jeju United in the K League draft. He failed to make an impression in his first two years at Jeju due to numerous injuries. However, he slowly broke into the first team, mostly playing as a defensive midfielder. In January 2010, he was reportedly invited by Blackburn Rovers for a trial, but the move didn't happen. He spent a great season in 2010 at Jeju instead, driving his club to an unprecedented runner-up position. His contribution also enabled him to gain personal honors such as the Top Assists Award, the FANtastic Player Award, and the Best XI.

VfL Wolfsburg
On 30 January 2011, Koo successfully moved to VfL Wolfsburg during the winter transfer window, signing a three-and-a-half year contract for an undisclosed fee. On 12 February 2011, Koo made his Wolfsburg debut against Hamburger SV, coming on as a substitute in the 64th minute in the 1–0 home defeat. However, he had difficulty competing for places in the starting line-up during a year.

Loan to FC Augsburg
On 31 January 2012, he moved on loan to the league rivals FC Augsburg. On 18 February, he scored the equaliser outside the penalty area, but Augsburg lost 4–1 to Bayer Leverkusen. On 17 March, he scored the equaliser with a lob outside the penalty area, and his goal contributed to a 2–1 victory against Mainz 05. On 24 March, he assisted the equaliser, leading team's 1–1 draw against Werder Bremen. On 31 March, he scored the opening goal with a low shot outside the penalty area, contributing to a 2–1 victory against 1. FC Köln. On 7 April, he scored the equaliser through Manuel Neuer's legs, but his goal couldn't prevent a 2–1 loss to Bayern Munich. On 5 May, he scored the winning goal with a header in a 1–0 victory against Hamburger SV. During his loan period, he scored five goals and provided two assists in 15 appearances, becoming Augsburg's top goalscorer, although he played only half a season for them. He performed a significant part in helping Augsburg to escape relegation in their maiden season in the Bundesliga.

In his second season at Augsburg, Koo was plagued by injuries, but he still helped his club survive relegation in the limited games he played in. In a DFB-Pokal match, he was involved in an altercation with Bayern Munich's midfielder Franck Ribéry. After a disputed free kick he confronted Ribéry and touched his face, in response Ribéry slapped Koo. Referee Thorsten Kinhöfer gave Koo a yellow card and sent off Ribéry. Bayern Munich director Karl-Heinz Rummenigge demanded that the ejection be overturned, while Bayern's coach Jupp Heynckes blamed both Koo and Ribéry, stating that although Koo had provoked Ribéry the latter should learn to not react under pressure.

Mainz 05
In the 2013–14 season, he returned to Wolfsburg, and played as a central midfielder or winger. However, he wanted more appearances, and preferred playing as an attacking midfielder like when he played for Augsburg. On 18 January 2014, it was announced that Koo penned a four-and-a-half year deal with Mainz 05. In the 2014–15 season, however, he was used as a winger again to replace Eric Maxim Choupo-Moting and Nicolai Müller, who left Mainz 05. On 31 July 2014, he contributed to a 1–0 victory by assisting the winning goal against Asteras Tripoli in the third qualifying round of the 2014–15 UEFA Europa League. On 7 August, he scored his first Europa League goal, but Mainz 05 were eliminated from the tournament after losing the second leg 3–1 to Asteras Tripoli. He recorded five goals and two assists during 23 appearances in the 2014–15 Bundesliga.

Return to FC Augsburg
On 31 August 2015, Koo rejoined Augsburg, and so Augsburg spent a season with three South Korean players, including Ji Dong-won and Hong Jeong-ho. On 12 September, he assisted the opening goal with a backheel pass in the first half, but Augsburg lost 2–1 to Bayern Munich after conceding two goals in the second half. On 23 September, he won a penalty against Granit Xhaka, but it was insufficient to reverse Augsburg's defeat to Borussia Mönchengladbach. On 21 February 2016, he scored a solo goal against Hannover 96 and it became the winning goal. On 6 March, he scored Augsburg's first-ever Bundesliga hat-trick, but Augsburg failed to protect their 3–0 lead by drawing 3–3 with Bayer Leverkusen. He recorded eight goals and four assists with 29 appearances in the 2015–16 Bundesliga. He also participated in the 2015–16 UEFA Europa League, the first UEFA competition in Augsburg's history. Augsburg recorded three wins and three losses in the group stage, and succeeded in advancing to the knockout stage. Afterwards, they lost 1–0 on aggregate to Liverpool in the round of 32. After the 2015–16 season, he was ranked fifth in the attacking midfielder rankings of the German sports magazine kicker.

On 3 February 2020, he achieved his 200th Bundesliga appearance against Mainz 05. He left Augsburg by turning down a contract extension with the club after the 2018–19 season. He wanted to contract with one of the top teams of the Bundesliga, but finally joined Qatar Stars League side Al-Gharafa in August 2019.

International career
Koo played a central role in helping South Korea finish third in the 2011 AFC Asian Cup, with five goals and three assists over the tournament, finishing as the tournament's top scorer.

During the 2012 Summer Olympics, Koo played as a central midfielder in the South Korea under-23 team. He appeared in every game in the tournament, and scored the second goal during the second half of the bronze medal match against Japan, securing a 2–0 victory for Korea. The South Korean team won the bronze medal in football for the first time in its Olympics history and in doing so, became the second Asian team in the Olympics men's football to reach the semi-finals.

He was named captain of the national team ahead of the 2014 FIFA World Cup, and scored in a 4–2 defeat to Algeria in the team's second group match. He was selected for the 2015 Asian Cup and played a decisive role in South Korea's opening match, a 1–0 victory over Oman, and was named man of the match. In the match against Australia, Ja-cheol suffered an injury and missed the remainder of the tournament.

On 25 January 2019, Koo announced his retirement from international duty after South Korea lost in the quarter-finals of the 2019 AFC Asian Cup.

Style of play
Koo showed his best performance when playing as an attacking midfielder, although he originally deployed as a defensive midfielder. He sometimes played as a central midfielder, second striker, or winger if necessary. He was praised for his techniques, especially a talent for getting out of opponents' pressure, while keeping the ball. He also had an ability to find the back of the net, often displaying a knack to charge into the opposition penalty box unsighted. However, he was occasionally criticized that his individual ability slowed down his team's tempo.

Personal life
Koo likes to go shopping in his spare time in Germany. He is currently the honorary ambassador for The Republic of Korea Air Force. Koo is also a close friend with his teammate Ki Sung-yueng, and they like to display their friendly, humorous conversations on Twitter. Ki revealed on the Korean talk show Healing Camp, Aren't You Happy that Koo has a nickname called "Koogle Georim" (Korean: 구글거림) because of his sometimes goofy way of talking. On 24 June 2013, Koo married a Jeju woman three years his senior at the Sheraton Grande Walkerhill Hotel.

Career statistics

Club

International

Scores and results list South Korea's goal tally first.

Honours
South Korea U23
Summer Olympics bronze medal: 2012
Asian Games bronze medal: 2010

South Korea
AFC Asian Cup runner-up: 2015
EAFF Championship: 2008

Individual
K League 1 Best XI: 2010
K League 1 top assist provider: 2010
K League FANtastic Player: 2010
AFC Asian Cup top goalscorer: 2011
K League All-Star Game Most Valuable Player: 2013
FC Augsburg All-time XI: 2020

References

External links

Koo Ja-cheol – National Team Stats at KFA 

1989 births
Living people
People from Nonsan
Association football midfielders
South Korean footballers
South Korean expatriate footballers
South Korean expatriate sportspeople in Germany
South Korean expatriate sportspeople in Qatar
South Korea international footballers
2011 AFC Asian Cup players
2014 FIFA World Cup players
2015 AFC Asian Cup players
Jeju United FC players
VfL Wolfsburg players
FC Augsburg players
1. FSV Mainz 05 players
Al-Gharafa SC players
Al-Khor SC players
K League 1 players
Bundesliga players
Qatar Stars League players
Expatriate footballers in Germany
Expatriate footballers in Qatar
Footballers at the 2012 Summer Olympics
Olympic footballers of South Korea
Olympic bronze medalists for South Korea
Olympic medalists in football
Medalists at the 2012 Summer Olympics
South Korea under-20 international footballers
South Korea under-23 international footballers
Jeonju University alumni
Asian Games medalists in football
Footballers at the 2010 Asian Games
Asian Games bronze medalists for South Korea
Medalists at the 2010 Asian Games
Neungseong Gu clan
2018 FIFA World Cup players
2019 AFC Asian Cup players
Sportspeople from South Chungcheong Province